Birmingham City Football Club, an English association football club based in the city of Birmingham, was founded in 1875 under the name of Small Heath Alliance. They first entered the FA Cup in the 1881–82 season. When nationally organised league football began in 1888, the club, by then called simply Small Heath F.C., were not invited to join the Football League. Instead, they became a founder member of the Football Alliance, which was formed a year later. In 1892, the Football League decided to expand, and invited the Alliance clubs to join; as one of the less successful members of the Alliance, Small Heath were placed in the newly formed Second Division. The club's first team have competed in numerous nationally and internationally organised competitions, and all players who have played between 1 and 24 such matches are listed below.

More than 500 Birmingham players have appeared in such matches but failed to reach the 25-match milestone. In the early days, the scarcity of nationally organised competitive football meant players could spend many years with the club while making few such outings. Brothers Fred, Tommy and Arthur James, who was the club captain from 1878 to 1885, were founder members of Small Heath Alliance but made only 24 between them.

Numerous players left Birmingham to seek opportunities with other teams. Fred Pentland, who played in one FA Cup tie as a youngster for Birmingham, went on to play for England, coach the German and French Olympic teams, and manage Athletic Bilbao to consecutive La Liga–Copa del Rey "doubles". He was succeeded as Athletic's manager by Ralph Kirby. Steve Finnan, whose professional career began at the club, went on to win the 2005 Champions League with Liverpool and played for the Republic of Ireland at the 2002 World Cup. Some players' careers were cut short by the two World Wars. For example, Tom Farrage, a "promising young player with an eye for goal", was killed in action serving with the Parachute Regiment in 1944.

Many players spent brief periods with Birmingham on loan from other clubs. Some were young players gaining experience: Michael Carrick went on to play more than 300 Premier League matches and Sigurd Rushfeldt became the Norwegian Tippeligaen's all-time top scorer. Other loanees had an established career but were not needed by their owning club: Nigeria international Obafemi Martins scored Birmingham's winning goal against Arsenal in the 2011 Football League Cup Final before his loan spell was cut short by injury.

Key
The list is ordered first by number of appearances in total, then by number of League appearances, and then if necessary by date of debut.
Appearances as a substitute are included.
Statistics are correct up to and including the match played on 18 March 2023. Where a player left the club permanently after this date, his statistics are updated to his date of leaving.

Players with fewer than 25 appearances

Players with 25 or more appearances

Footnotes

Player statistics include games played while on loan from clubs listed below. Unless individually sourced, loaning clubs come from the appearances source or from

References
General

Specific

Sources
 
 
 
 
 

 
Birmingham City
Players
Association football player non-biographical articles